The first government of Felipe González was formed on 3 December 1982, following the latter's election as Prime Minister of Spain by the Congress of Deputies on 1 December and his swearing-in on 2 December, as a result of the Spanish Socialist Workers' Party (PSOE) emerging as the largest parliamentary force at the 1982 Spanish general election.

González's first cabinet marked several firsts in Spanish history: it was the first purely left-of-centre government in Spain under the monarchy in Spain, as well as the first one to be set up in peacetime period. It comprised members of the PSOE and its sister party, the Socialists' Party of Catalonia (PSC), as well as one member from the Democratic Action Party (PAD)—which had contested the 1982 election in alliance with the PSOE and would merge into it in January 1983—and one independent. It was automatically dismissed on 23 June 1986 as a consequence of the 1986 general election, but remained in acting capacity until the next government was sworn in.

Investiture

Council of Ministers
The Council of Ministers was structured into the offices for the prime minister, the deputy prime minister and 15 ministries. Shortly after coming into office, the Finance and Economy and Trade portfolios were merged into a single Economy and Finance ministry.

Departmental structure
Felipe González's first government was organised into several superior and governing units, whose number, powers and hierarchical structure varied depending on the ministerial department.

Unit/body rank
() Secretary of state
() Undersecretary
() Director-general
() Autonomous agency
() Military & intelligence agency

Notes

References

External links
Governments. Juan Carlos I (20.11.1975 ...). CCHS-CSIC (in Spanish).
Governments of Spain 1982–1996. Ministers of Felipe González. Historia Electoral.com (in Spanish).
The governments of the first period of the Spanish Socialist Workers' Party (1982–1996). Lluís Belenes i Rodríguez History Page (in Spanish).

1982 establishments in Spain
1986 disestablishments in Spain
Cabinets established in 1982
Cabinets disestablished in 1986
Council of Ministers (Spain)